Neopomacentrus taeniurus (freshwater demoiselle) is a brackish and freshwater species of damselfish found in the western and central Indo-Pacific.

References

Pomacentridae
Taxa named by Pieter Bleeker
Fish described in 1856